Hedgecock is a surname. Notable people with the surname include:

Madison Hedgecock (born 1981), American football player
Roger Hedgecock (born 1946), American talk radio host